Joseph Ernest Atkins (1947 – January 23, 1999) was an American serial killer and Vietnam War veteran who murdered three people in South Carolina. He murdered his half-brother in 1969 and received a life sentence. After Atkins’ adoptive father pleaded with officials for his release, he was released on parole in 1980. In 1985, Atkins murdered a 13-year-old neighbor girl and his adoptive father. Atkins was convicted of these two murders, sentenced to death, and executed in 1999.

Early life 
Joseph was born in 1947. The unwanted child of a sex worker, he was adopted by Benjamin Frank Atkins and Gladys Atkins and lived in North Charleston, South Carolina. Joseph was reportedly frequently beaten and berated by his adoptive father, and attacked by his older half-brother, Charles Edward Atkins. On one occasion, he had to get surgery after Charles repeatedly stabbed him in the stomach. In addition, Joseph said he witnessed his adoptive father abuse his adoptive mother. He believed Gladys getting her head hit during the abuse resulted in the brain tumor which killed her when he was 15.

Military service 
In the late 1960s, Joseph was sent to fight in Vietnam. He fought on the border of Cambodia and Laos. There, Joseph reportedly saw people being killed and mutilated, and heard fellow captured soldiers being tortured to death. Joseph was returned to the U.S. in October 1969. He was later awarded a Vietnam Campaign Medal, a Vietnam Service Medal, and a National Defense Service Medal.

Murders, trial, and execution 
On December 31, 1969, Joseph and Charles Atkins, 23, were visiting a friend's house when the two got into a fight. Angry, he left the house and went back to his adoptive father's house, which was several miles away. There, Joseph got a shotgun, returned to his friend's house, and fatally shot Charles.  As he left his friend's house, Joseph then shot out the windows. 

Joseph was indicted for murder in March 1970. Attorneys for both sides agreed to a guilty plea for manslaughter. On May 28, 1970, Joseph appeared before a judge, who asked him to tell the court his version of what happened. Joseph replied "he [Charles] reached back like this in his back pocket where he had his gun, and I was scared he was going to shoot." The judge said he could not accept Joseph's guilty plea if he was claiming to have acted in self-defense. The plea deal fell through and the case went to trial. The jury rejected Joseph's claim of self-defense and he was found guilty of murder. After they recommended mercy, he was sentenced to life in prison. After Benjamin Atkins pleaded for his adoptive son's release, Joseph was paroled on March 14, 1980. He returned to North Charleston to live in half of a duplex owned by his father. He worked several jobs, had alcoholism problems, and lived with his girlfriend, Linda Walters. In the spring of 1985, Aaron Polite, his wife, Fatha Patterson, and their 13-year-old daughter, Karen Patterson, moved into the duplex. Despite being neighbors, Joseph barely interacted with them.

On October 27, 1985, after a night of drinking, Joseph returned to the duplex armed with a machete, revolver, and a sawed-off shotgun. After waking up and seeing Joseph, Aaron woke up his wife, who tried to call Joseph's father, 75-year-old Benjamin Atkins. However, the phone lines had been cut by Joseph. Aaron stayed inside as Fatha left to tell Benjamin. During this time, Joseph went to the bedroom of the couple's daughter and killed Karen by shooting her once in the head with his shotgun. After hearing the gunshot, Aaron went to his daughter's bedroom and saw Joseph, who proceeded to chase and fire multiple shotgun rounds at him. Eventually, Joseph returned to the duplex.

After hearing the gunshots, Benjamin and Fatha called the police. When Fatha opened the door, she saw Joseph pointing his shotgun at her. As Fatha panicked and backed away, Joseph walked out onto the porch. Joseph then shot his adoptive father in the shoulder. Benjamin stumbled back inside, where he collapsed and died.

As Fatha shut the door and ran to the telephone, Joseph started firing through the walls into the duplex. He then got onto his motorcycle and fled the scene. Afterwards, Aaron and Fatha ran to their daughter's bedroom, where they found her in a pool of blood. Karen was taken to a hospital, where she later died.

Detective Schuster, a neighboring off-duty police officer who was returning home saw the flash of the gunshots and Joseph fleeing the scene. He called for backup and chased Joseph for several miles. Joseph was arrested after crashing and falling off of his motorcycle.

Arthur Henderson, the neighbor who Joseph had been drinking with the night before, would testify that Joseph told him "well, when I go home anything I see in sight I'm going to kill."

In January 1986, Joseph Atkins was indicted for two counts of murder, two counts of assault with intent to kill, one count of first degree burglary, and two counts of unlawful possession of a weapon. Joseph's prior murder conviction made the murders of his father and Karen Patterson capital offenses. Prosecutors sought death sentences against him for both of the murders. In June 1986, Joseph was convicted of all of the charges. His defense team argued for leniency on the grounds of his alcoholism and intoxication at the time the murders. However, the prosecution pointed to the cutting of the phone lines as evidence he was well aware of his actions.

Referring to Joseph's using his military service as mitigation, the prosecution said "And you go to that wall in Washington, and there are fifty thousand names of soldiers who have died, of heroes. You pick out any one of those names of the fifty thousand. Pick one out. Soldier, you've given the ultimate sacrifice. You've been there. Would your service in any way mitigate or excuse the horrible conduct of this defendant, the intentional, malicious murder of his father and of a 13-year-old, defenseless, innocent child? They would be insulted by the question were they alive, insulted by the question. To use that as an excuse for what went on here is insulting."

After deliberating for just over an hour, the jury recommended a death sentence on both counts. One of Joseph's appeals concerned the issue of parole eligibility. South Carolina did not have life without parole at the time of the murders.

During the trial, the jury asked the judge whether they could impose consecutive life sentences, having been previously told that Joseph would become eligible for parole after 20 years if he was given a life sentence. After the judge replied that the question of concurrent or consecutive sentences was his decision, the prosecution said the jury's actual question was if they could give Joseph a life sentence with no chance of parole for 40 years.

The judge said Joseph would become eligible for parole after 20 years regardless of whether his life sentences were consecutive or concurrent. In 1990, the South Carolina Supreme Court agreed in a 4-1 decision that multiple life terms with parole eligibility could not be aggregated.

After a failed appeal for clemency, Joseph was executed by lethal injection at Broad River Correctional Institution in Columbia, South Carolina on January 23, 1999. His last meal consisted of steak, fries, tossed salad, corn on the cob, and chocolate pudding. Joseph declined to make a final statement.

See also 
 Capital punishment in South Carolina
 List of people executed in South Carolina
 List of serial killers in the United States

References 

1947 births
1999 deaths
20th-century American criminals
20th-century executions by South Carolina
20th-century executions of American people
American military personnel of the Vietnam War
American murderers of children
Executed American serial killers
People convicted of murder by South Carolina
People executed by South Carolina by lethal injection